Durovo-Bobrik is a rural locality in Vyshnederevensky Selsoviet Rural Settlement, Lgovsky District, Kursk Oblast, Russia. Population:

Geography 
The village is located in the Bobrik River basin (a left tributary of the Reut River in the Seym basin), 31 km from the Russia–Ukraine border, 66 km south-west of Kursk, 21 km south-east of the district center – the town Lgov, 10 km from the selsoviet center – Vyshniye Derevenki.

 Climate
Durovo-Bobrik has a warm-summer humid continental climate (Dfb in the Köppen climate classification).

Transport 
Durovo-Bobrik is located 4 km from the road of regional importance  (Lgov – Sudzha), on the road of intermunicipal significance  (38K-024 – Vyshniye Derevenki – Durovo-Bobrik), 2.5 km from the nearest (closed) railway halt 25 km (railway line Lgov I — Podkosylev).

The rural locality is situated 72 km from Kursk Vostochny Airport, 124 km from Belgorod International Airport and 271 km from Voronezh Peter the Great Airport.

References

Notes

Sources

Rural localities in Lgovsky District